Michael Richard Côté (born June 19, 1949) is an American prelate of the Roman Catholic Church, serving as the bishop of the Diocese of Norwich in Connecticut and parts of New York since 2003.  He previously served as auxiliary bishop of the Diocese of Portland in Maine from 1995 to 2003

Biography

Early life 
Michael Côté was born on June 19, 1949, in Sanford, Maine. He first attended Our Lady of Lourdes Seminary in Cassadaga, New York, then went to Assumption College in Worcester, Massachusetts.  Côté later graduated from St. Mary's Seminary College in Baltimore, Maryland with a Bachelor of Philosophy degree. He then went to Rome to study at the Pontifical Gregorian University, receiving a Master of Theology degree in 1975.

Priesthood
Côté was ordained to the priesthood for the Diocese of Portland by Pope Paul VI on June 25, 1975, in St. Peter's Basilica in Rome. After returning to Maine, he served the next three years as parochial vicar at two parishes; Saints Athanasius and John in Rumford, Maine and Holy Rosary in Caribou, Maine. Côté entered the Catholic University of America School of Canon Law in Washington, D.C. in 1979, receiving his Licentiate of Canon Law in 1981.

Following his return from Catholic University in 1981, Côté was appointed adjutant judicial vicar of the Diocesan Tribunal in Portland.  From 1984-1987 he served as a member of the Diocesan Pastoral Council. In 1989, Côté returned to Washington to serve as secretary of the Nunciature of the Holy See.  After five years with the nunciature, Côté was appointed pastor of Sacred Heart Parish in Auburn, Maine.   In 1994, he became a member and then the chair of the Council of Priests for the diocese. That same year, Côté was named to the College of Consultors.

Auxiliary Bishop of Portland

On May 9, 1995, Côté was appointed as auxiliary bishop of the Diocese of Portland and titular bishop of Cebarades by John Paul II. He received his episcopal consecration on July 27, 1995, at the Cathedral of the Immaculate Conception in Portland from Bishop Joseph Gerry, with Bishop Robert Mulvee and Cardinal Raymond Burke serving as co-consecrators. As an auxiliary bishop, Côté's primary ministry was to the parishes in Northern Maine.

Bishop of Norwich
John Paul II appointed Côté as the fifth bishop of the Diocese of Norwich on March 11, 2003.  He was installed on May 14, 2003.

In 2004, Côté became embroiled in a dispute with Reverend Justinian B. Rweyemamu, the parochial vicar at St. Bernard Parish in Rockville, Connecticut.  Rweyemamu claimed that Côté had denied him a promotion because he is black.  After Rweyemamu filed a complaint with the US Equal Employment Opportunity Commission, Côté allegedly removed him from his parish and his chaplain job in retaliation.  Côté said he removed Rweyemamu due to his refusal to answers any questions about Bugurka Orphans and Community Economic Development, his private charity in Tanzania, and the content of some of his homilies.  In Spring 2005, Côté unsuccessfully sued to evict Rweyemamu from a church rectory.  In August 2005, Côté ordered him to move to a convent in Sprague, Connecticut and live in isolation.

On April 3, 2010, Côté announced his opposition to a bill in the Connecticut General Assembly that would remove the statute of limitations for sexual abuse crimes.  A letter signed by the state's Catholic bishops said that this bill would cause tremendous damage to Catholic institutions and missions. On December 14, 2010, Côté announced that the diocese charity, Haitian Ministries for the Diocese of Norwich, was being replaced by a new organization, Diocese of Norwich Outreach to Haiti, Inc.  He mentioned that the diocese was slowly distributing $430,892 collected from parishioners in January that year to prevent waste and misappropriation.

On February 10, 2019, Côté released a list of 43 clerics from the diocese with substantial allegations of abuse against them.  Of the 43 clerics, 33 were deceased and the remainder were not performing ministry. He announced on July 16, 2021 that the diocese was declaring Chapter 11 bankruptcy to facilitate settlement of sexual abuse lawsuits.  Over 60 lawsuits were filed by former residents of Mount Saint John School in Deep River, Connecticut,  a former church residential school for troubled boys.

See also

 Catholic Church hierarchy
 Catholic Church in the United States
 Historical list of the Catholic bishops of the United States
 List of Catholic bishops of the United States
 Lists of patriarchs, archbishops, and bishops

References

External links
Roman Catholic Diocese of Norwich
Roman Catholic Diocese of Portland
Haitian Ministries is Shut Down

Episcopal succession

 

Roman Catholic Ecclesiastical Province of Hartford
1949 births
Living people
Catholic University of America alumni
St. Mary's Seminary and University alumni
Roman Catholic bishops of Norwich
Catholic University of America School of Canon Law alumni
21st-century Roman Catholic bishops in the United States